Benzothiophene is an aromatic organic compound with a molecular formula C8H6S and an odor similar to naphthalene (mothballs).  It occurs naturally as a constituent of petroleum-related deposits such as lignite tar.  Benzothiophene has no household use.  In addition to benzo[b]thiophene, a second isomer is known: benzo[c]thiophene.

Benzothiophene finds use in research as a starting material for the synthesis of larger, usually bioactive structures. It is found within the chemical structures of pharmaceutical drugs such as raloxifene, zileuton, and sertaconazole, and also BTCP.  It is also used in the manufacturing of dyes such as thioindigo.

Synthesis 
Most syntheses of benzothiophene create substituted benzothiophenes as a precursor to further reactions. An example is the reaction of an alkyne-substituted 2-bromobenzene with either sodium sulphide or potassium sulphide to form benzothiophene with an alkyl substitution at position 2.

Thiourea can be used as a reagent in place of sodium sulphide or potassium sulphide.

In the presence of a gold catalyst, a more complex 2,3-disubstituted benzothiophene can be synthesised.

References

 
Simple aromatic rings